Howard Charles Liebengood, a United States Capitol Police officer, died by suicide on January 9, 2021, three days after he participated in the law enforcement response to the . He was the first of what were reported as two police suicides in the immediate aftermath of the attack, though Metropolitan Police (MPD) officer Jeffrey L. Smith's widow disputes the manner of death. In the months after the civil disturbance at the Capitol, it was generally reported that the deaths of five people who were present have, to varying degrees, been related to the event. Some members of Congress and press reports included these two in the number of fatalities, for a total of seven.

Prior to his death by suicide, Liebengood, 51, worked three 24-hour shifts without sleep. Liebengood was survived by his wife Serena, and his two siblings. Liebengood's father was well known to many U.S. Senators, due to his service as the United States Senate Sergeant at Arms. The elder Liebengood went into business in the 80s with Paul Manafort and Roger Stone - even founding the event company that put on the ellipse rally on January 6.

On August 5, 2021, Howard Liebengood, along with Capitol Police officers Brian Sicknick, Metropolitan Police officer Jeffrey L. Smith, as well as an officer who died at an earlier incident Billy Evans, was posthumously honored in a signing ceremony for a bill to award Congressional Gold Medals to Capitol Police and other January 6 responders. His name is noted in the text of the bill, and President Biden remarked on his death. On May 14, 2021, the US Capitol Police named their new counseling center after Liebengood.

In November of 2022, the United States Department of Justice classified Liebengood's suicide as a line-of-duty death, enabling his family to receive benefits through the Public Safety Officers' Benefit Program. This was the first designation for an officer who died in connection with the Capitol riot since Congress expanded eligibility to include those suffering from the traumatic effects of what they experienced on duty.

On January 6, 2023, "for his deep dedication and selfless service," Liebengood was posthumously awarded the Presidential Citizens Medal by President Joe Biden.

See also
Police officer safety and health

References

Deaths by person in the United States
Deaths related to the January 6 United States Capitol attack
Presidential Citizens Medal recipients